Lichkov is a municipality and village in Ústí nad Orlicí District in the Pardubice Region of the Czech Republic. It has about 500 inhabitants. In lies in the Orlické Mountains on the border with Poland.

References

External links

Villages in Ústí nad Orlicí District